Jefirstson R. Riwu Kore (born January 13, 1960) is an Indonesian politician and mayor of Kupang since 2017. He was previously member of People's Representative Council from East Nusa Tenggara. In February 2021, he contracted COVID-19.

References 

1960 births
Living people